Marenghi may refer to:

Jerry Maren, an American actor (born Gerard Marenghi)
Garth Marenghi, a fictional horror author
Garth Marenghi's Darkplace, a television series
Charles Marenghi & Cie, a French organ building company